Berden Priory was a priory in Essex, England. This site now has a Grade II* listed late 16th-century timber-framed house, the centre of Berden Priory Farm.

References

Monasteries in Essex
Berden